Signe Wirff (4 November 1887 – 18 December 1956) was a Swedish film actress. She appeared in more than 30 films between 1921 and 1955.

Selected filmography

 House Slaves (1933)
 Adventure in Pyjamas (1935)
 A Cruise in the Albertina (1938)
 Sun Over Sweden (1938)
 A Real Man (1940)
 How to Tame a Real Man (1941)
 Nothing Is Forgotten (1942)
 Young Blood (1943)
 Imprisoned Women (1943)
 Man's Woman (1945)
 Kristin Commands (1946)
 Crisis (1946)
 Incorrigible (1946)
 The People of Simlang Valley (1947)
 Restaurant Intim (1950)
 Jack of Hearts (1950)
 Pimpernel Svensson (1950)
 Getting Married (1955)
 Whoops! (1955)

References

External links

1887 births
1956 deaths
Swedish film actresses
Actresses from Stockholm
20th-century Swedish actresses